Maria Fransisca (born 1959; as Tjan So Gwan; 曾素光), is an Indonesian badminton player who played in the singles and doubles events.

Career 
In the beginning Fransisca was known as Tjan So Gwan (Chinese descent), and changed her name to Maria Fransiska after received her Indonesian citizenship, take the oath in South Jakarta court in November 1980.

Fransisca started her career when she was trusted to strengthen the women's team at the 1978 Uber Cup women's team championship at that time Indonesia was the defending champion two years ago in the final Indonesia had to meet again with Japan's enemy she was expected to win points but failed by losing to  Atsuko Tokuda 11 -5, 11–4. Finally, the Indonesian women's team failed and again lost to Japan.

At the India Open, Fransisca was able to present 3 titles from three sectors, namely the women's singles she won against her compatriot  Ivana Lie in women's doubles, to team up with her again to fight the British women's doubles, and in the mixed doubles she and  Hariamanto Kartono also succeeded defeating his fellow strugglers  Rudy Heryanto and Ivana Lie, she managed to prove she was still reliable.

At the Indonesia Open, she also won a title by defeating the Chinese women's doubles and in the SEA Games event, she won a gold medal in women's doubles and women's team and one silver in mixed doubles.

Achievements

World Masters Games 

Women's doubles

Mixed doubles

World Senior Championships 
Mixed doubles

Asian Championships 
Women's doubles

Southeast Asian Games 
Women's doubles

Mixed  doubles

International Open Tournaments (4 titles, 3 runners-up) 
The World Badminton Grand Prix has been sanctioned by the International Badminton Federation from 1983 to 2006.

Women's singles

Women's doubles

Mixed doubles

References 

1959 births
Living people
People from Pasuruan
Sportspeople from East Java
Indonesian Hokkien people
Indonesian people of Chinese descent
Indonesian female badminton players
Badminton players at the 1978 Asian Games
Asian Games silver medalists for Indonesia
Asian Games medalists in badminton
Medalists at the 1978 Asian Games
Competitors at the 1979 Southeast Asian Games
Competitors at the 1983 Southeast Asian Games
Southeast Asian Games gold medalists for Indonesia
Southeast Asian Games medalists in badminton